Heikki Mäkelä (born 19 February 1946 in Lahti) is a Finnish sprint canoeist who competed from the late 1960s to the mid-1970s. Competing in three Summer Olympics, he earned his best finish of fifth in the K-4 1000 m event at Mexico City in 1968.

References

1946 births
Living people
Sportspeople from Lahti
Canoeists at the 1968 Summer Olympics
Canoeists at the 1972 Summer Olympics
Canoeists at the 1976 Summer Olympics
Finnish male canoeists
Olympic canoeists of Finland